Cyclophora suppunctaria is a moth in the family Geometridae. It was described by Philipp Christoph Zeller in 1847. It is found in Spain, Andorra, France, Austria, Switzerland, Italy, Slovakia, Albania, Slovenia, Croatia, Bulgaria, Romania, Hungary, North Macedonia, Greece, on Sardinia, Corsica, Sicily and Crete, as well as in Tunisia, Turkey, Russia and Ukraine.

The larvae feed on Quercus species, including Quercus pubescens, Quercus pyrenaica and Quercus robur.

References

Moths described in 1847
Cyclophora (moth)
Moths of Europe
Moths of Africa
Moths of Asia
Taxa named by Philipp Christoph Zeller